Astrid Freudenstein (born October 9, 1973, in Bad Griesbach im Rottal) is a German civil servant and politician of the Christian Social Union in Bavaria (CSU).

Education and early career 
After graduating from Wilhelm-Diess-Gymnasium Pocking in 1992, Freudenstein initially completed an internship at unserRadio, a local radio station in Passau. In 1993 she began her studies at the University of Passau, which she completed in 1998. In addition to her studies, she completed another internship at Passauer Neue Presse as a scholarship holder of the Dr. Hans-Kapfinger-Stiftung.

After completing her studies, Freudenstein worked as a journalist for Bayerischer Rundfunk and as an author in the Neue Zürcher Zeitung. In 2009, she received the title of Dr. phil. (PhD) with the thesis The Power Physicist against the Media Chancellor, in which she analyzed the gender aspect in the coverage of the 2005 federal election campaign. Since 2010, she has been a research associate and academic lecturer in media studies at the University of Regensburg.

In 2018, Freudenstein became head of the central department of the Federal Ministry of Transport and Digital Infrastructure, led by minister Andreas Scheuer.

Political career
Freudenstein joined the CSU in 2004 and has been a councilor in Regensburg since 2008.

She surprisingly entered the German Bundestag in the 2013 general election. There, she was a full member of the Committee on Employment and Social Affairs and the Committee on Culture and Media, as well as a deputy member of the Committee on Transport and Digital Infrastructure. Since 2014, she also chaired the German-Croatian Parliamentary Friendship Group and was a member of the session board of the German Bundestag.

The focus of Freudenstein's work in the Bundestag was disability policy. As the rapporteur of the CDU/CSU parliamentary group, she contributed to the legislative process of the Federal Law on Participation. In transport policy, she successfully argued for the inclusion of the 6-lane expansion of the A3 motorway between Regensburg and Nittendorf in the Federal Transport Infrastructure Plan.

Freudenstein could not enter the Bundestag again in the 2017 general election because the CSU won all constituencies in Bavaria and thus, no CSU deputy could enter the Bundestag via the state list. However, she replaced Marlene Mortler, who was elected to the European Parliament in the 2019 European election, in the 19th German Bundestag on July 2, 2019. She has since been serving on the Committee on Food and Agriculture.

Freudenstein is a member of the CSU district board of Oberpfalz. In addition, she is a member of the state executive committee of the Women's Union of Bavaria.

Political positions
Freudenstein is one of the 75 members of the Union – 68 from the CDU (26.9% of all CDU deputies) and 7 from the CSU (12.5% of all CSU deputies) – who voted in favor of allowing same-sex marriage in July 2017.

Personal life 
Freudenstein is Roman Catholic, married, and has one child.

References

External links 

 Biography from the Bundestag
 Personal website
 Curriculum vitae from the CDU/CSU parliamentary group

Articles containing video clips
1973 births
Members of the Bundestag for Bavaria
Living people
Members of the Bundestag 2017–2021
Members of the Bundestag 2013–2017
Female members of the Bundestag
People from Passau (district)
Members of the Bundestag for the Christian Social Union in Bavaria
21st-century German women politicians